Keith Wilson may refer to:

 Keith Wilson (cricketer) (1894–1977), English cricketer
 Keith Wilson (South Australian politician) (1900–1987), Senator for South Australia and later federal member for Sturt 
 Keith Wilson (musician) (1916–2013), American clarinetist and Yale University music instructor
 Keith Wilson (production designer) (1941–2011), British television and film production designer 
 Keith Wilson (sailor) (born 1937), Canadian Olympic sailor
 Keith Wilson (shearer), New Zealand shearer 
 Keith M. Wilson (?–2018), historian and author
 Keith Wilson (footballer) (1935–2000), Australian rules footballer
 Keith Wilson (Western Australian politician) (born 1936), Member of the Western Australian Legislative Assembly (1977–1993)
 J. Keith Wilson, American Asian art curator
 Keith Wilson, NASCAR crew chief for Jimmy Means Racing during the 1990s